Nicolae Hortolomei (November 27, 1885 – January 3, 1961) was a Romanian surgeon, director of the Surgery and Urology Clinic at Colțea Hospital in Bucharest, professor at the Faculty of Medicine, titular member of the Romanian Academy, and Minister of Health.

Education and career 
He was born on November 27, 1885, in Huși, Fălciu County. From 1895 to 1902, he attended the Costache Negruzzi National College in Iași, and then studied at the Faculty of Medicine of the University of Iași. In 1909, he obtained his doctorate in medicine and surgery with thesis Congenital absence of the tibia written under the guidance of Ernest Juvara. A few years later Hortolomei went back to Paris for specialization in urology in the clinic of Félix Legueu. During the Romanian campaign of World War I he  organized field hospitals in Moldavia, together with Iacob Iacobovici. After the Union of Bessarabia with Romania, he was appointed head of the surgery department at the Gubernial Hospital in Chișinău. In 1920, he became professor of surgery at the Faculty of Medicine of the University of Iași. Among his students there were Vladimir Buțureanu, Gheorghe Chipail, Oscar Franche, and Gheorghe Plăcinteanu.

In 1930, Hortolomei transferred to the Colentina Hospital in Bucharest, while in 1933 he became director of the surgery and urology clinic at Colțea Hospital and professor at the Carol Davila University of Medicine and Pharmacy.

From 1939 to 1940, Hortolomei served as Minister of Health in the Gheorghe Tătărescu government. He was elected titular member of the Romanian Academy in 1948. He was also a member of the French Académie nationale de chirurgie.

He died in Bucharest on January 3, 1961. The coffin was deposited in the hall of the Institute of Medicine and Pharmacy, and the burial took place on January 5, at Bellu Cemetery, with military honors. In Contemporanul, the poet Tudor Arghezi dedicated a tablet to him, in which he wrote: "Hortolomei closed his eyes in the minute when time passes by, at midnight, in the beginning of the year.  I would have been told that he was raising his glass to the health of man and mankind."

Publications

References

1885 births
1961 deaths
People from Huși
Costache Negruzzi National College alumni
Alexandru Ioan Cuza University alumni
Romanian surgeons
Romanian medical writers
Academic staff of Alexandru Ioan Cuza University
Academic staff of the Carol Davila University of Medicine and Pharmacy
Titular members of the Romanian Academy
Burials at Bellu Cemetery
Romanian Ministers of Health
20th-century surgeons